Michael Hayden may refer to:

Michael Hayden (artist) (born 1943), Canadian artist
Mike Hayden (born 1944), Kansas governor
Michael Hayden (general) (born 1945), former National Security Agency (NSA) director, former CIA director
Michael R. Hayden (born 1951), Canadian physician, geneticist and scientific researcher
Michael Hayden (actor) (born 1963), stage and television actor

See also
Michael Haydn (1737–1806), Austrian composer